The UEFA Women's Euro 1995 final was an association football match on 26 March 1995 at Fritz-Walter-Stadion in Kaiserslautern, Germany, to determine the winner of UEFA Women's Euro 1995.

Background

Germany

Germany defeated England over 2-legged tie to reach the final.

Sweden

Sweden defeated Norway over 2-legged tie to reach the final.

Match

Summary

Germany won a closely contested match against Sweden 3-2.

Final

References

External links
Official tournament website

Final
2001
1995
1995
March 1995 sports events in Europe